The San Francisco Sheriff's Office (SFSO), officially the City and County of San Francisco Sheriff's Office, is the sheriff's office for the City and County of San Francisco. The current sheriff is Paul Miyamoto. The department has 850 deputized personnel and support staff. The SFSO is a separate organization from the San Francisco Police Department. However, SFSO deputies and SFPD officers have all attended a POST-mandated police academy, and are duly-sworn California peace officers.

The primary function of the SFSO is to operate the system of county jails where there is an average population of 2,200 inmates, and a number of individuals on supervised release programs.

The SFSO also provides security and law enforcement in the following locations in San Francisco: the civil and criminal court, City Hall, the Emergency Communications & Dispatch center, and the San Francisco General Hospital, Laguna Honda Hospital, and several public health clinics.

History 

Michael Hennessey was elected to sheriff in 1979.

Hennessey retired in 2011 as the city's longest serving sheriff. He endorsed Supervisor Ross Mirkarimi, who was elected to sheriff in the November 2011 election. In March 2012, Mayor Ed Lee appointed Vicki Hennessy as Interim Sheriff after Mirkarimi was suspended for official misconduct. With the appointment, Hennessy became the city's first female sheriff. Hennessy elected to a full term in the November 2016 election.

Paul Miyamoto became the first Asian-American sheriff in California when he was elected in the 2019 election.

In September 2021, Supervisor Ahsha Safaí introduced legislation that would allow off-duty deputies to work as security guards at private businesses during overtime hours, like the San Francisco Police Department, amidst a rise in smash and grab retail theft. On December 7, 2021, the San Francisco Board of Supervisors voted 7–3 to approve the ordinance.

County Jails

San Francisco County operates eight jails, with approximately 55,000 people booked annually. Two of these jails are located in the Hall of Justice on Bryant Street. One of the jails is located in ward 7D/7L in San Francisco General Hospital. Two jails are located at the San Bruno Complex, located ten miles south of San Francisco.

The largest San Francisco jail complex is in an unincorporated part of San Mateo County between Pacifica and San Bruno. The San Bruno complex is home to County Jail 5, a modern direct-supervision facility which was opened in 2006.

The new County Jail 5 replaced the 1934 San Bruno Jail, which had been designated County Jail 3. Before its closure in 2006, the old San Bruno jail was the oldest operating county jail west of the Mississippi River. When opened in 1934, it replaced the outdated Ingleside jails, which dated from the late 1800s, and were located on the site of today's City College of San Francisco. West of County Jail 5 is County Jail 6, which opened in 1989.

The 1934 San Bruno jail closed in 2006 after the new jail opened. Demolition began in 2012.

Prior to the new facility opening, the most modern San Francisco Jail was the one located near the Hall of Justice on Seventh Street. Opened in 1994, the complex is actually two jails. This main complex jail is a "direct supervision facility [that] has become a national model for program-oriented prisoner rehabilitation."  The second, which acts as the main intake and release facility for the city, was praised by architecture critic Allan Temko as "a stunning victory for architectural freedom over bureaucratic stupidity." While in custody, prisoners are afforded the opportunity to attend various classes that can earn credit towards a high school diploma.

Intake & Release
 County Jail 1 (425 7th Street, near Hall of Justice, San Francisco)

Classification
 County Jail 2 (425 7th Street, San Francisco)

Housing
 County Jail 2 (425 7th Street, San Francisco)
 County Jail 3 (1 Moreland Drive, San Bruno) (New state-of-the-art facility opened in 2006)
 County Jail 7 (Ward 7D/7L of San Francisco General Hospital)

See also

 List of law enforcement agencies in California
 Jails of San Francisco, California
 Sheriffs in the United States
 San Francisco Police Department

References

External links
 San Francisco Sheriff's Office Official website
 San Francisco Sheriff's Department History Online
 San Francisco Sheriff's Managers & Supervisors Association
 San Francisco Deputy Sheriffs' Association
 Protecting San Francisco - SFDSA Non Profit
 San Francisco Deputy Sheriffs

Government of San Francisco
Sheriffs' departments of California
Law enforcement in the San Francisco Bay Area
1850 establishments in California